Wray is an unincorporated community in Irwin County, Georgia, United States. Wray has a post office with ZIP code 31798.

References

Unincorporated communities in Irwin County, Georgia
Unincorporated communities in Georgia (U.S. state)